Lee Miller (1907–1977) was an American photographer.

Lee Miller or Millar is also the name of:

Lee Miller (footballer) (born 1983), Scottish footballer
Lee Thomas Miller, American country songwriter
Lee Millar, voice of Pluto, in Mr. Mouse Takes a Trip etc.
Lee Miller, actor who played Sgt. Brice on the 1957 Perry Mason series

See also
Leigh Miller (disambiguation)